Maxie is a given name, a nickname and a surname which may refer to:

People

Given name
 Max Baer (boxer) (1909–1959), American world champion heavyweight boxer, nicknamed "Madcap Maxie"
 Max Maxie Anderson (1934–1983), American hot air balloonist
 Maxie Baughan (born 1938), American former National Football League player
 Maxie Berger (1917–2000), Canadian world champion junior welterweight boxer
 O. Maxie Max Burns (born 1948), American politician
 Maxie Dunnam, chancellor of Asbury Theological Seminary
 Maxie Patton Kizzire (born 1986), American golfer
 Maxie Lambright (1924-1980), American college football head coach
 Maxwell Maxie Long (1878-1959), American sprinter and 1900 Olympic champion
 James "Maxie" McCann (born 1934), Irish former soccer player
 Maxwell Maxie Parks (born 1951), American sprinter
 "Slapsie Maxie" Max Rosenbloom (1907–1976), American world champion Hall-of-Fame light-heavyweight boxer
 Maxie Vaz (1923–1991), Indian field hockey player
 Maxie Wander (1933-1977), Austrian writer
 Maxie Williams (1940-2009), American Football League and National Football League player

Surname
 Brett Maxie (born 1962), American National Football League coach and former player
 Demetrious Maxie (born 1973), Canadian football player
 Leslie Maxie (born 1967), Olympic hurdler, host of the television show Cold Pizza
 Peggy Maxie (born 1936), American former politician, first African-American woman elected to the Washington House of Representatives

Fictional characters
 Maxie (Pokémon), the leader of Team Magma in the Pokémon series
 Maxie Jones, on the American soap opera General Hospital
 Maxie Malone, the title character of Maxie, a 1985 film starring Glenn Close as Maxie
 Maximilian Maxie Zeus, a DC Comics villain

See also
 "Maxi", a nickname of Glenn Maxwell (born 1988), Australian cricketer
 "Maxy", a nickname of Michael Klinger (born 1980), Australian retired cricketer
 Max Hermann Maxy (1895–1971), Romanian painter and art professor
 Maxxie Oliver, a character in the British series Skins

Masculine given names
Hypocorisms